My Baby Don't Slow Dance is a song written by Bill Lamb and Peter Wood, and recorded by American country music artist Johnny Lee.  It was released in September 1983 as the second and final single from the album Hey Bartender.   The song reached number 23 on the Billboard Hot Country Singles & Tracks chart and number 13 on the Canadian RPM Country Tracks chart.

Chart performance

References

Songs about dancing
1983 singles
1983 songs
Johnny Lee (singer) songs
Song recordings produced by Jimmy Bowen
Warner Records singles